Akali Naina Singh Nihang was a Nihang warrior and fifth Jathedar of Budha Dal. He was born around 1736, into a  Sidhu Jat family, in Khudi Kurd, in Barnala district. He was also caretaker of Darbar Sahib . He learned Gurbani and martial skills from Baba Deep Singh. He joined Budha Dal at the age of 20, along with his nephew Nihang Kharag Singh. He was guardian of Akali Phula Singh (1761-1823) and trained him with scriptures, warfare and martial arts.  Bhai Naina Singh, the uncle and the predecessor of Akali Phula Singh used Akali as a prefix of his name. His successor Phula Singh became even more popular as an Akali. He is credited for introducing the tall pyramidal turban, which is common among the Nihangs.

Gallery

References

Nihang
1736 births
Year of death unknown